Samla takashigei is a species of sea slug, an aeolid nudibranch, a marine heterobranch mollusc in the family Samlidae.

Distribution
This species was described from Osezaki, Japan, . It was previously confused with Samla bicolor.

References

Samlidae
Gastropods described in 2017